Mir was a Soviet/Russian space station.

Mir or MIR may also refer to:

Places
Mir, Belarus, an urban settlement
Mir Castle Complex, a historic fortified castle in Belarus
Mir, Vareš, a village in Bosnia and Herzegovina
Mir (Calixto García), a village in Holguín Province, Cuba
Mir, Iran, a village in Alborz Province, Iran
Mir, Lorestan, a village in Lorestan Province, Iran
Mir mine, an abandoned open-pit diamond mine in East Siberia
Musiktheater im Revier, a theater in Gelsenkirchen, Germany

People with the name
Mir (title), a title for a ruler
Mir clan, a Kashmiri family line

Surname
Aasmah Mir, Scottish-Pakistani television presenter
Frank Mir, American mixed martial artist, former UFC heavyweight champion
Hamid Mir, Pakistani journalist and a terrorism expert and security analyst 
Joan Mir, Spanish Grand Prix motorcycle rider, 2020 MotoGP world champion
Joaquin Mir Trinxet, modernist Spanish painter
Magín Mir, Spanish footballer
Pedro Mir (1913–2000), poet, laureate of the Dominican Republic
Rafa Mir, Spanish footballer

Given name
Mir Afsar Ali, Indian radio jockey and television anchor
Mir Hazar Khan Khoso, Pakistani politician
Mir Kalam, Pakistani politician and leader of the Pashtun Tahafuz Movement 
Mir Ranjan Negi, Indian hockey player
Mir Taqi Mir (1723–1810), Urdu poet
Mir of Tidore (c. 1511-1550s), third sultan of Tidore, Maluku Islands

Science and technology
Mir (lens), a Soviet photographic lens
Mir (payment system), Russia
Mid-infrared
Micropower Impulse Radar
microRNA (miRNA or miR), a small non-coding RNA molecule
Multiple isomorphous replacement, a crystallographic technique
Music information retrieval

Computing
Mir, an Independent Media Center content management system
Mir (software), a computer display server
MIR (computer), an early Soviet personal computer
Maximum Information Rate of broadband wireless data
Medium Intermediate representation

Publishing
Mir Publishers, a Russian publishing house
Management International Review, a journal
The Mechanics' Institute Review
McGill International Review

Music
Mir (band), a Canadian music group
Mir (South Korean singer), Bang Chul-yong, member of band MBLAQ
Mir (album), a 2011 album by Ott

Organisations
Revolutionary Left Movement, several South American groups
Mir, Russian ferris wheel manufacturer
Military Intelligence Research (MIR), later MD1 (military R&D organisation), UK, WWII
Mir (television company)

Judaism
Mir yeshiva (Belarus)
Mir yeshiva (Brooklyn), successor to the Belarus Mir Yeshiva
Mir yeshiva (Jerusalem), successor to the Belarus Mir Yeshiva

Transportation
Metropolitan Intercity Railway Company, a Japanese railway company
STS Mir, a Russian sailing ship
Mir (submersible), a self-propelled Deep Submergence Vehicle
Monastir International Airport (IATA code), in Tunisia

Fiction
Mir, a character in Ar tonelico: Melody of Elemia
Mir, a fictional place in Time's Eye by Arthur C. Clarke and Stephen Baxter

Other uses
Mir (commune), a type of rural community in Imperial Russia
Battle of Mir (disambiguation)
Mail-in rebate, a coupon
MIR, Master of International Relations
 mir, ISO 639-3 language code for Isthmus Mixe
Meriam language or Mir, Torres Strait Islands, Australia

See also
Mir-e Aliabad, in Yazd Province, Iran
Myrrh
Mire (disambiguation)
The Legend of Mir (disambiguation) 
Mir 1 (disambiguation) 
Mir 2 (disambiguation) 
Mir 3 (disambiguation)